Karen Ann King-Aribisala (born Guyana) is a Nigerian novelist, and short story writer. She is a Professor of English at the University of Lagos.

Education 
She was educated at the International School Ibadan, St. George's British International School, Italy (where she met her future husband; Femi Aribisala), and the London Academy of Dramatic Arts.

Works
Our Wife and Other Stories, Malthouse Press, 1990, ; Ottawa, Canada: Laurier Books, 2004,  
 Kicking Tongues, Heinemann, 1998,  
The Hangman's Game, Peepal Tree, 2007, 
 Bitter Leafing Woman and Other Stories, Malthouse Press, 2017.

Prizes and awards 
Her collection of stories, Our Wife and Other Stories won the 1991 Commonwealth Writers' Prize, Best First Book Africa, and her novel The Hangman's Game won 2008 Best Book Africa. 

She also won grants from the Ford Foundation, British Council, Goethe Institute, and the James Michener Foundation.

Anthologies

Reviews
Frank Birbalsingh, "Karen King-Aribisala: The Hangman’s Game", Guyana Journal, November 2008.
"A review of Karen King-Aribisala's The Hangman's Game", The Signifyin' Woman, 19 April 2008.

References

External links
"Conversation with Karen Ann King-Aribisala", Nigerians in America, Ronnie Uzoig, 04/10/2003

Living people
Nigerian women novelists
Academic staff of the University of Lagos
20th-century Nigerian novelists
21st-century Nigerian novelists
20th-century Nigerian women writers
21st-century Nigerian women writers
Year of birth missing (living people)
International School, Ibadan alumni
Alumni of the London Academy of Music and Dramatic Art
Guyanese emigrants to Nigeria